Yuriy Melsitov (Юрий Мельситов; born July 7, 1964) is Kazakh shooter. He is winner of the 2006 Asian Games in rifle prone team competition.

References
 Athlete information (ISSF web site)

1964 births
Living people
Asian Games medalists in shooting
Shooters at the 1994 Asian Games
Shooters at the 1998 Asian Games
Shooters at the 2002 Asian Games
Shooters at the 2006 Asian Games
Shooters at the 2010 Asian Games
Asian Games gold medalists for Kazakhstan
Asian Games silver medalists for Kazakhstan
Asian Games bronze medalists for Kazakhstan
Kazakhstani male sport shooters
Medalists at the 1994 Asian Games
Medalists at the 2002 Asian Games
Medalists at the 2006 Asian Games
Medalists at the 2010 Asian Games